Chelsea Gladden is founder of Everything Branding, a full service public relations firm based in San Diego, California that has been featured on Beauty Independent  and SD Voyager. Gladden has been working with media since 2001, starting her public relations path with Sony Pictures Entertainment.

Work 
Chelsea Gladden is founder of Everything Branding, a full service public relations firm based in San Diego, California that has been featured on Beauty Independent, Parade  and SD Voyager. Gladden has been working with media since 2001, starting her public relations path with Sony Pictures Entertainment. Gladden has been a regular television guest  as well as written articles for top media like People, Parents, Pregnancy, Disney's BabyZone, Mashable, The Muse and more. Working with brands and company founders, Gladden regularly secures national media for clients with outlets like the Today Show, Good Morning America, BuzzFeed, PopSugar, CNN, Refinery29, Reader's Digest and more.

References

Sources 
 
 Working Mother's 8 Ways to Give Back with Your Kids 
 Breezy Mama Celebrity Interviews
 People Magazine's Around the Web
 Preparing for Back to School on NBC San Diego
 Discussing Weight Loss on FOX 5 San Diego
 Health Magazine Yes You Can with Chelsea Gladden
 Health Magazine Yes You Can with Chelsea Gladden
 Yahoo News Blood Test Predicts Baby's Sex at 7 Weeks
 US News 6 Baby Services New Parents Should Buy
 USA Today Early Buzz
 In the Baby Zone with Amy Poehler
 CafeMom: Things To Do If You Lose Your Temper  
 Gabby and Laird: How to Fit In Workouts and Work

External links 
 Chelsea Gladden's official website

Public relations
American bloggers
Living people
Writers from San Diego
Writers of blogs about home and family
Year of birth missing (living people)